Taraxia is a small genus of flowering plants in the family Onagraceae, native to western Canada and the western and west-central United States. Nuclear DNA evidence shows that it is sister to a clade containing all genera in the tribe Onagreae except for Oenothera, Eulobus, and Chylismia.

Species
The following species are accepted:
Taraxia breviflora 
Taraxia ovata 
Taraxia subacaulis 
Taraxia tanacetifolia

References

Onagraceae
Onagraceae genera
Flora of Western Canada
Flora of the Northwestern United States
Flora of the Southwestern United States